Itumaleng Moseki (born 26 August 1991) is a South African cricketer. He made his first-class debut for Northerns in the 2018–19 CSA 3-Day Provincial Cup on 13 December 2018. He made his List A debut for Northerns in the 2018–19 CSA Provincial One-Day Challenge on 17 March 2019.

References

External links
 

1991 births
Living people
South African cricketers
Northerns cricketers
Place of birth missing (living people)